Dome (pronounced Dor-mi) is a town in the Ga East Municipal District, a district in the Greater Accra Region of Ghana. As of 2012, Dome is the nineteenth largest settlement in Ghana, in terms of population, with a population of 78,785 people.

References

Populated places in the Greater Accra Region
Upper East Region